RSO or R.S.O. may refer to:

Roles and titles 
 Range safety officer, a person responsible for the safe use of rocket vehicles
 Radiation Safety Officer, a person responsible for the safe use of radiation and radioactive materials
 Regional Security Officer, a Diplomatic Security Service Special Agent in charge of security at a US embassy
 Regional Security Office, office in a US embassy or consulate for the Diplomatic Security Service
 , Knight of the Order of the Sword 
 Reconnaissance systems officer, operator of surveillance systems and equipment on a Lockheed SR-71 Blackbird aircraft

Organisations 
 "Radio Symphony Orchestra", used by a number of orchestras:
 Danish National Symphony Orchestra, based in Copenhagen, Denmark
 North German Radio Symphony Orchestra, based in Hamburg, Germany
 Stuttgart Radio Symphony Orchestra, based in Stuttgart, Germany
 Bavarian Radio Symphony Orchestra, based in Munich, Germany
 Frankfurt Radio Symphony Orchestra, based in Frankfurt, Germany
 Finnish Radio Symphony Orchestra
 Swedish Radio Symphony Orchestra
 Vienna Radio Symphony Orchestra
 Richardson Symphony Orchestra, based in Richardson, Texas
 Roanoke Symphony Orchestra, based in Roanoke, Virginia
 Rogers Sportsnet Ontario, a television station in Ontario, Canada
 RSO Records, a record label formed by Robert Stigwood in the late 1960s

 Rohingya Solidarity Organisation, a political organization and former insurgent group in Myanmar (Burma)

Military technology 
 Raupenschlepper, Ost, a fully tracked World War II German artillery tractor
 Radschlepper Ost, a wheeled World War II German artillery tractor

Other 
 Railway Sub Office (1855-1905), a British Royal Mail office which received mail directly from rail transport
 Reactive Search Optimization, problem-solving methods with integrated online machine-learning capabilities
 Revised Statutes of Ontario, the provincial laws of Ontario, Canada
 Registered sex offender, a person listed on a sex offender registry
 Republic of South Ossetia, a separatist organization in Georgia.

 Resident Space Object, any man-made object in Earth orbit no longer used by anyone
 RSO, musical duo consisting of American musician Richie Sambora and Australian musician Orianthi.
Rick Simpson oil, a form of cannabis concentrate. 
Red Star OS, also abbreviated as RSOS, is a North Korean operating system.